The Forecast is the debut album and third release by Australian band In Fiction. One single has been released to radio from the album, "Liar Liar".

Track listing

References

2008 debut albums
In Fiction albums